Vangsvik or Vangsvika is a village in Senja Municipality in Troms og Finnmark county, Norway.  The village has a population of about 350.  The village has a school, Vangsvik Chapel, store, and medical office.  There is also a large fish farming facility nearby.  The Senja Rutebil (bus company) has its headquarters in Vangsvik. The village was the administrative centre of the old municipality of Tranøy until 1 January 2020 when it was merged into Senja Municipality.

Vangsvik is located on the south side of the island of Senja, along the Solbergfjorden.

References

Villages in Troms
Populated places of Arctic Norway
Senja